Martin Kallstrom (born 1975) is a Swedish tech entrepreneur and the CEO and founder of Narrative, a tech start up marketing a clip camera, as well as Twingly, a blog search engine.

Early life

Kallstrom was born in Sweden. He studied computer science at Linköping University where he graduated with a Master of Science degree.

Career

After graduating, Kallstrom worked as a programmer at Framfrab, a Swedish e-consultancy firm. In 200, he travelled to Tokyo where he worked as a freelance graphics and web designer, honing skills and experience that would eventually lead to him starting his own business. Prior to launching his first start-up, he worked as an advisor to Blippex, a search engine that only indexes web pages that have been viewed by real internet users.

In 2006, he founded and served as the CEO of Twingly, a popular blog search engine, before stepping down in 2012 to pursue a new project, Memoto. He founded the company with Oskar Kalmaru and Bjorn Wesen in Stockholm and started to design and produce the world's smallest wearable “life-logging” camera, the Narrative clip. The project was launched with the help of a Kickstarter campaign that raised over $500,000 in one month, followed by a cash injection of $3 million from San Francisco-based True Ventures.

References

1975 births
Living people